Aqcheh Owbeh (also Romanized as Āqcheh Owbeh; also known as Āghjeh Owbeh) is a village in Dizajrud-e Gharbi Rural District, in the Central District of Ajab Shir County, East Azerbaijan Province, Iran. At the 2006 census, its population was 521, in 144 families.

References 

Populated places in Ajab Shir County